Daniel Christensen (born 19 September 1988) is a Danish retired footballer.

Career

He made his debut in the Superliga for AaB on 23 April 2009 in an away match against Esbjerg fB. The game ended in a 3–1 defeat for AaB, with Christensen coming on in the 65th minute for Patrick Kristensen. In 2016, Christensen was signed by Westerlo of the Belgian First Division A.

On 29 July 2020 it was confirmed, that 31-year old Christensen had decided to retire and focus on his job as a real estate agent.

References

External links
 

1988 births
Living people
Danish men's footballers
Danish expatriate men's footballers
AaB Fodbold players
SønderjyskE Fodbold players
Aarhus Gymnastikforening players
K.V.C. Westerlo players
Vendsyssel FF players
Belgian Pro League players
Danish Superliga players
Danish 1st Division players
Association football midfielders
Danish expatriate sportspeople in Belgium
Expatriate footballers in Belgium